Actinopus apalai is a species of mygalomorph spider in the family Actinopodidae. It can be found in Brazil.

The specific name apalai is in honor of the Apalai indigenous people of Brazil.

References 

apalai
Spiders described in 2020